The Piney Buttes,  el.

See also
 List of mountain ranges in Montana

Notes

Mountain ranges of Montana
Landforms of Garfield County, Montana
Buttes of Montana